Katnaghbyur (also Romanized as Kat’naghbyur, Katnaghbur, and Katnakhpyur; formerly, Agadzor, Agadarasi) is a town in the Kotayk Province of Armenia.

See also 
Kotayk Province

References 

Populated places in Kotayk Province